The 2020–21 Skeleton World Cup was a multi-race series over a season for skeleton. The season started on 20 November 2020 Sigulda, Latvia and finished on Innsbruck-Igls, Austria on 29 January.

Calendar

Results

Men

Women

Standings

Men

Women

Medal table

Points

References 

Skeleton World Cup
2020 in skeleton
2021 in skeleton